Pattani River (Jawi: سوڠاي ڤتنا) is a river in southern Thailand. It originates in Betong district, Yala Province and empties into the Gulf of Thailand at the town of Pattani. Within Yala Province the river forms the Bang Lang Reservoir.

The Bang Lang Dam is built on the river.

Rivers of Thailand